Azikeyevo (Äjekäy) is a rural locality (a village) in Bolsheustyikinsky Selsoviet, Mechetlinsky District, Bashkortostan, Russia. The population was 684 as of 2010. There are 15 streets.

Geography 
Azikeyevo is located 14 km north of Bolsheustyikinskoye (the district's administrative centre) by road. Srednyaya Oka is the nearest rural locality.

References 

Rural localities in Mechetlinsky District